In 1940, 24 Indian pilots, also known as the X-squad, were sent to the UK for operational training and squadron service with the Royal Air Force Volunteer Reserve (RAFVR).

The pilots included Ranjan Dutt, Erlic W. Pinto, Hari C. Dewan, Mahinder Singh Pujji and Man Mohan Singh. Of the 24, 16 qualified as pilots and six were posted to non-flying duties. Eight completed further training as fighter pilots and served in RAF squadrons after the Battle of Britain. Others were selected for Bomber/Coastal Command.

Eight were killed during training or in action. Some of those who survived became Air Marshalls in the Indian Air Force (IAF) after independence.

Recruitment
In 1940, the Air Ministry requested the British Government in India to send Indian pilots for further training in England. On 8 August 1940, 24 mostly newly qualified Indian pilots were recruited from Lahore and Ambala to join the RAFVR. They left Lahore for Bombay (now Mumbai) on 3 September 1940, and departed India as one group at the end of September 1940.

UK
The group arrived in England on the P&O liner SS Strathallan on 6 October 1940 and headed for RAF Uxbridge on 8 October. Their arrival was given widespread media coverage. When they reached a London train station, they were greeted by Sir Louis Leisler Greig and the photographer William G. Vanderson. Each were also individually welcomed by the Air Minister, Sir Archibald Sinclair, who handed each a note concluding "We shall be proud to have you fighting by our side". They were conducted by J. M. R. Jayakar. 

After a month the group had tea with the King before being divided in two. Most were posted to No. 12 Elementary Flying Training School RAF at Prestwick to train on Tiger Moths. Advanced training was completed at No. 9 Service Flying Training School at RAF Hullavington, Wiltshire, and they received their wings on 16 April 1941. Of the 24, six were posted to non-flying duties.  Eight had qualified for fighter training at No. 56 OTU at RAF Sutton Bridge. They included Dutt, Pujji, Mehta, Gnanamuthu and Nazirullah. They mostly served in RAF squadrons after the Battle of Britain for around three months in 1941. Others were selected for Bomber/Coastal Command.

At first they received 425 rupees per month and an annual oversees allowance of £25, which was raised to £100.

Deaths and legacy
Eight were killed during training or in action. Dewan, Pinto, Shivdev Singh and Dutt later became Air Marshalls in the Indian Air Force after independence.

In 2014 a statue of Pujji was erected in Gravesend, Kent. Man Mohan Singh's name is remembered on the Darwin Military Museum Memorial Wall, Australia.

List of pilots

Gallery

Footnotes

References

Bibliography

External links 
 (British Pathé)
 (British Pathé)

Indian Air Force
Royal Air Force Volunteer Reserve personnel of World War II
1940 in the United Kingdom